Sir Robert Harry Drayton  (14 April 1892 - 20 February 1963), was a lawyer and a senior colonial civil servant who worked in Palestine, Tanganyika,  Ceylon, Jamaica and Pakistan. He served as the Chief Secretary of Ceylon from 1942 to 1947 and as the Legal Secretary of Ceylon.

Robert Harry Drayton was born 14 April 1892 in Exeter, Devon, the oldest son of Harry Godwin Drayton (1865-1927), a bookseller, and Emma Rose Hetty née Brealy (1866-1926).

Drayton was educated at Exeter School before being articled to Roberts and Andrew, of Exeter. At the outbreak of World War I he enlisted in the Public Schools Battalions, serving as a sergeant, and was appointed as a lieutenant in the Machine Gun Corps, fighting in France from January 1916 to September 1917. After graduating from the University of London with a law degree, he qualified as a solicitor in 1919, joining the Treasurer Solicitor's Department.

On 16 October 1920 he married Gertrude Edith Phillips (1886 - 1967), an Australian who had seen war service as a theatre nursing sister with ANZAC forces in Gallipoli, at Christ Church, Holborn, Middlesex. They had a son and two daughters: Denys (1923-2012), a major in the British India Army (7th Gurkha Rifles), Aide-de-camp to the British High Commissioner in Malaya, Sir Henry Gurney and Superintendent of the Uganda Police Force; Dianne (1928-2015), a senior administrative assistant at Reuters and the founding secretary of the Reuter Society; and Ruth.

Drayton joined the Colonial Legal Service and was appointed the assistant legal secretary in Mandatory Palestine in 1920 and in 1922 the assistant Attorney General (which subsequently became the Solicitor General) in Palestine. In 1931 he was appointed legal draftsman to the Palestine Government and in 1933, he compiled and catalogued the laws, decrees, regulations, rules, which were issued in Palestine in addition to the British Royal laws and decrees enforced in the Mandate, The Laws of Palestine : in force on the 31st day of December 1933.

Drayton passed the bar at Gray's Inn in 1934, becoming a barrister, following which he was appointed as the Attorney General for Tanganyika.

In 1939 he was transferred to Ceylon and appointed as the Legal Secretary of Ceylon in 1940, before  succeeded Guy Stanley Wodeman as Chief Secretary of Ceylon in 1942.

In the 1942 Birthday Honours he was made a Companion of the Order of St Michael and St George and on 22 February 1944 he was knighted, as part of the 1944 New Year Honours list, for his service as Chief Secretary of Ceylon. He returned to England in 1947 when Ceylon gained its independence and served for three years as the Director of the Statutory Publications Office, the agency responsible for the publication and indexing of statutes.

In 1950 Drayton returned to Asia as chief draftsman to the Constituent Assembly of Pakistan, serving in the role for three years.

Drayton died on 20 February 1963 at The Hospital in Weybridge, Surrey.

Bibliography

References

External links
 HMS CEYLON VISITS COLOMBO. 5 JANUARY 1944. THE COLONY CLASS CRUISER HMS CEYLON MADE A CALL AT COLOMBO, THE CAPITAL …

1892 births
1963 deaths
Lawyers from Exeter
People educated at Exeter School
Chief Secretaries of Ceylon
British expatriates in Sri Lanka
British people in Mandatory Palestine
Tanganyika (territory) people
19th-century British lawyers
Machine Gun Corps officers
British Army personnel of World War I
Military personnel from Exeter
Colonial Legal Service officers
Colonial Administrative Service officers
Ceylonese Companions of the Order of St Michael and St George
Knights Bachelor
English barristers
English solicitors
Members of Gray's Inn
Alumni of the University of London
British colonial attorneys general in Asia
Members of the 2nd State Council of Ceylon
Legal Secretary of Ceylon